Adam Józef Lipiński, is an economist, editor and lecturer, as well as a founder of the Law and Justice party in Lower Silesia.

Life 
He was born in 1956, and is a graduate from II Secondary School in Legnica and the Wrocław University of Economics.

He has worked at the “Hanka” Garment Factory in Legnica, and was a member of the Regional Board of the NSZZ "S" (Solidarity) in Wrocław and was an activist in the democratic opposition. In the 1970s, he was a member of the Student Committee of Solidarity, then the spokesman of the Committee for Social Self-defence in Legnica. In 1981 he was the head of the Publishing House of Solidarity in Wrocław. Until 1989 he had to remain undercover, acting in the conspiratorial underground during the martial law period. Among other things he was the head of the printing unit of the Regional Strike Committee (RKS) in Wrocław, he founded the organization Ruch Społeczny Solidarność (Social Movement of Solidarity), he was also the editor-in-chief of several books and magazines including Kret Publishing House and the monthlies Konkret, and Nowa Republika, which were distributed mainly in Lower Silesia (Wrocław, Legnica, Głogów, Jelenia Góra and in Warsaw).

He has been a political activist since Poland regained independence in 1989. In 1989, he was the president of Democratic Centre association, member of the Civic Committee in Wrocław, founder of Centre Alliance in Lower Silesia, and a deputy for this party to the Sejm of the Republic of Poland of the first term (1991–1993) as well as the editor-in-chief and then publisher of the nationwide socio-political weekly “Nowe Państwo”, which was published in Warsaw.

He was a founder of the Law and Justice (PiS) party in Lower Silesia and a deputy for the Sejm of the 4th and 5th term representing this party in the Legnica and Jelenia Góra constituency. On 4 November 2005, he was appointed Secretary of State at the Chancellery of the Prime Minister. From July 2006 to November 2007, he held the position of the Head of the Political Cabinet of Prime Minister Jarosław Kaczyński where he was responsible for the government’s cooperation with the parliament and for the policy to support democracy in post-communist countries and was the head of a dedicated team to deal with these issues. He was a coordinator for a number of election observations for elections in Ukraine during the so-called Orange Revolution (in total approximately 1,500 people). He was organizer of media projects aimed to support Belarus: Radio Racja and Belsat TV. He was co-author of the law Card of the Pole, which grants special rights to Poles who live abroad in the East. He was the president of the Polish-Moldovan Parliamentary Group. and initiator of projects providing assistance to the Cuban opposition.

In the parliamentary election on 25 October 2015 he was re-elected as a deputy for the Sejm of the Republic of Poland from the Law and Justice list in Legnica and Jelenia Góra constituency. He is currently the Vice-President of the Law and Justice party, member of the Political Committee of the party and the President of the Regional Council of Lower Silesia and CEO of the Regional Board of Law and Justice in Legnica. In November 2015, he was appointed Secretary of State at the Chancellery of the Prime Minister. He was re-elected in 2019. On 4 November 2020 he was nominated for a 6-year term as vice-president of the National Bank of Poland. Therefore, he ended his term as the deputy and Secretary of State. He resigned from his PiS membership, as well.

Lipiński is married and has one child. He has collected over 10,000 books.

Honours 

 Cross of Freedom and Solidarity (2016)
 Commander's Cross of the Hungarian Order of Merit (2016)

References

External links
Official website
Parliamentary profile

1956 births
Living people
Government ministers of Poland
People from Głubczyce
Law and Justice politicians
Centre Agreement politicians
Commander's Crosses of the Order of Merit of the Republic of Hungary (civil)
Members of the Polish Sejm 1991–1993
Members of the Polish Sejm 2001–2005
Members of the Polish Sejm 2005–2007
Members of the Polish Sejm 2007–2011
Members of the Polish Sejm 2011–2015
Members of the Polish Sejm 2015–2019
Members of the Polish Sejm 2019–2023
Polish book and manuscript collectors
Recipients of Cross of Freedom and Solidarity
Solidarity (Polish trade union) activists
Wrocław University of Economics alumni